Conizonia allardi is a species of beetle in the family Cerambycidae. It was described by Léon Fairmaire in 1866. It is known from Tunisia, Algeria, and Morocco. It feeds on Centaurea pullata.

Subspecies
 Conizonia allardi allardi Fairmaire, 1866
 Conizonia allardi guyi Sama, 2005

References

Saperdini
Beetles described in 1866